Maria Moloney (born 29 March 1995) is an Australian rules footballer playing for Port Adelaide in the AFL Women's competition (AFLW). She was playing for University of Queensland in the AFL Queensland Women's League when she was drafted by Brisbane with the 75th pick in the 2019 AFL Women's draft.

Moloney made her debut for Brisbane in their round 1 game against Adelaide at Hickey Park on 8 February 2020.

In May 2022, Moloney committed to join expansion side Port Adelaide.

Long-distance runner Virginia Moloney is her sister.

References

External links
 

1995 births
Living people
Sportswomen from Queensland
Australian rules footballers from Queensland
Brisbane Lions (AFLW) players